Geochagundo, also Geocha Gundo, are an archipelago in the Yellow Sea, located about 30 km (19 mi) south-west of Jindo, in the administrative divisions of Donggeochado-ri and Seogeochado-ri, Jodo-myeon, Jindo County, South Jeolla Province.

Geochagundo consists of the islands Donggeochado (동거차도), Mangdo (망도), Bukdo (북도), Sangsongdo (상송도), Hasongdo (하송도), Songdo (송도), Seogeochado (서거차도), Sangjukdo (상죽도, 웃대섬), Hajukdo (하죽도, 아랫대섬), Hangdo (항도).

References 

Archipelagoes of South Korea
Jindo County
Landforms of South Jeolla Province
Islands of the Yellow Sea